Törmänen is a Finnish surname. Notable people with the surname include:

 Veikko Törmänen (born 1945), Finnish artist
 Jouko Törmänen (1954–2013), Finnish ski jumper
 Antti Törmänen (born 1970), Finnish professional ice hockey player
 Antti Törmänen (Go player) (born 1989), Finnish professional Go player
 Rosa Törmänen (born 1992), Finnish racing cyclist

Finnish-language surnames